is a prefecture of Japan located in the Kansai region of Honshu. Kyoto Prefecture borders Fukui Prefecture to the northeast, Shiga Prefecture to the east, Mie Prefecture to the southeast, Nara Prefecture and Osaka Prefecture to the south, and Hyōgo Prefecture to the west.

Kyoto is the capital and largest city of Kyoto Prefecture, with other major cities including Uji, Kameoka, and Maizuru. Kyoto Prefecture is located on the Sea of Japan coast and extends to the southeast towards the Kii Peninsula, covering territory of the former provinces of Yamashiro, Tamba, and Tango. Kyoto Prefecture is centered on the historic Imperial capital of Kyoto, and is one of Japan's two "prefectures" using the designation fu rather than the standard ken for prefectures. Kyoto has made Kyoto Prefecture one of the most popular tourism destinations in Japan for national and international tourists, and 21% of the prefecture's land area was designated as Natural Parks. Kyoto Prefecture forms part of the Keihanshin metropolitan area, the second-most-populated region in Japan after the Greater Tokyo area and one of the world's most productive regions by GDP.

History 

Until the Meiji Restoration, the area of Kyoto Prefecture was known as Yamashiro.

For most of its history, the city of Kyoto was Japan's Imperial capital. The city's history can be traced back as far as the 6th century. In 544, the Aoi Matsuri was held in Kyoto to pray for good harvest and good weather.

Kyoto did not start out as Japan's capital. A noteworthy earlier capital was Nara. In 741, Emperor Shōmu moved the capital briefly to Kuni-kyo, between the cities of Nara and Kyoto, in present-day Kyoto Prefecture. In 784, the capital was moved to Nagaokakyō, also in present-day Kyoto Prefecture. In 794, Emperor Kanmu moved the capital to Heian-kyō, and this was the beginning of the current-day city of Kyoto. Even today, almost all of the streets, houses, stores, temples and shrines in Kyoto exist where they were placed in this year.

Although in 1192 real political power shifted to Kamakura, where a samurai clan established the shogunate, Kyoto remained the imperial capital as the powerless emperors and their court continued to be seated in the city. Imperial rule was briefly restored in 1333, but another samurai clan established a new shogunate in Kyoto three years later.

In 1467, a great civil war, the Ōnin War, took place inside Kyoto, and most of the town was burned down. Japan plunged into the age of warring feudal lords. A new strong man, Tokugawa Ieyasu, established the shogunate at Edo (today's Tokyo) in 1603.

In the 15th century AD, tea-jars were brought by the shōguns to Uji in Kyoto from the Philippines which was used in the Japanese tea ceremony.

The Meiji Restoration returned Japan to imperial rule in 1868. Emperor Meiji, who was now the absolute sovereign, went to stay in Tokyo during the next year. The imperial court has not returned to Kyoto since then. During the instigation of Fuhanken Sanchisei in 1868, the prefecture received its suffix fu. The subsequent reorganization of the old provincial system merged the former Tango Province, Yamashiro Province and the eastern part of Tanba Province into today's Kyoto Prefecture.

Although many Japanese major cities were heavily bombed during World War II, the old capital escaped such devastation. During the occupation, the U.S. Sixth Army and I Corps were headquartered in Kyoto.

Geography 

Kyoto Prefecture is almost in the center of Honshu and of Japan. Kyoto is the 31st largest prefecture by size. To the north, it faces the Sea of Japan and Fukui Prefecture. To the south, it faces Osaka and Nara Prefectures. To the east, it faces Mie and Shiga Prefectures. To its west is Hyōgo Prefecture. The prefecture is separated in the middle by the Tanba Mountains. This makes its climate very different in the north and south.

 21% of the prefecture's land area was designated as Natural Parks, namely Sanin Kaigan National Park; Biwako, Kyoto Tamba Kogen, Tango-Amanohashidate-Ōeyama and Wakasa Wan Quasi-National Parks; and Hozukyō, Kasagiyama, and Rurikei Prefectural Natural Parks.

Municipalities 
Cities

Fifteen cities are located in Kyoto Prefecture:

Kansai Science City is located in the southwest.

Towns and villages
These are the towns and villages in each district:

Mergers

Demographics

Religion
According to Agency for Cultural Affairs research in 2020, over 60% believe in Shinto and Buddhism.

Politics
The current governor of Kyoto is Takatoshi Nishiwaki, a former vice minister of the Reconstruction Agency. He has been elected in April 2018.

The previous governor of Kyoto is former Home Affairs Ministry bureaucrat Keiji Yamada. He has been reelected to a fourth term in April 2014 with support from the major non-Communist parties against only one JCP-supported challenger.

The prefectural assembly has 60 members from 25 electoral districts and is still elected in unified local elections (last round: 2019). As of September 2020, it was composed as follows: Liberal Democratic Party 30, Japanese Communist Party 12, Democratic Party 11, Kōmeitō 5, Japan Restoration Party 2.

Kyoto's delegation to the National Diet consists of six members of the House of Representatives and four members (two per election) of the House of Councillors. After the national elections of 2016, 2017 and 2019, the prefecture is represented by four Liberal Democrats and two Democrats in the lower house, and two Liberal Democrats, one Democrat and one Communist in the upper house.

Prefectural symbols
The prefectural flower of Kyoto is the weeping cherry. The Kitayama Sugi is the official tree, and the streaked shearwater the bird that symbolizes the prefecture.

Defense facilities 
On 1 August 2013, prefectural and municipal authorities gave consent for a USFJ missile monitoring station to be set up in the city of Kyōtango. It will be co-located with a JASDF facility already based in the city. At least initially, its primary sensor will be a mobile X-band radar used to gather data on ballistic missile launches which will then be relayed by the station to warships equipped with Aegis air defense systems and to ground-based interceptor missile sites. A hundred and sixty personnel will be based at the station.

Economy 

Kyoto prefecture's economy is supported by industries that create value that is unique to Kyoto, such as the tourism and traditional industries supported by 1,200 years of history and culture, as well as high-technology industries that combine the technology of Kyoto's traditional industries with new ideas.

Northern Kyoto on the Tango Peninsula has fishing and water transportation, and midland Kyoto has agriculture and forestry. The prefecture produces 13% of the domestic sake and green tea. Japan's largest vertical farm is located in the prefecture.

The Kyoto-based manufacturing industry holds shares of Japan's high-technology product markets and others. As of 2021, eight Forbes Global 2000 companies were located in Kyoto prefecture: Nintendo, Nidec, Kyocera, Murata Manufacturing, Omron, Rohm, Bank of Kyoto, SCREEN Holdings. Takara Holdings, GS Yuasa, Mitsubishi Logisnext, Maxell, and Kyoto Animation are also based in the prefecture.

Education

Colleges and universities 

Bukkyo University
Doshisha University
Doshisha Women's College of Liberal Arts
Doshisha Women's Junior College
Hanazono University
Heian Jogakuin University
Ikenobo College
Kacho College
Kyoto Bunkyo University
Kyoto Bunkyo Junior College
Kyoto City University of Arts
Kyoto College of Economics
Kyoto College of Graduate Studies for Informatics

Kyoto Institute of Technology
Kyoto Junior College of Foreign Languages

Kyoto Koka Women's University

Kyoto Notre Dame University
Kyoto Pharmaceutical University
Kyoto Prefectural University
Kyoto Prefectural University of Medicine

Kyoto Saga University of Arts
Kyoto Sangyo University
Kyoto Seika University
Kyoto Seizan College
Kyoto Tachibana University
Kyoto University
Kyoto University of Advanced Science
Kyoto University of the Arts

Kyoto University of Education
Kyoto University of Foreign Studies
Kyoto Women's University
Meiji University of Integrative Medicine
Ōtani University
Otani University Junior College
Ritsumeikan University
Ryukoku University
Ryukoku University Faculty of Junior College
Shuchiin University
University of Fukuchiyama

Transportation

Railways

JR Central
Tōkaidō Shinkansen—Kyōto Station
JR West
Kyoto Line
Biwako Line
Kosei Line
Nara Line
Kansai Line (Kizu-Kamo)
Sagano Line
Sanin Line
Fukuchiyama Line
Maizuru Line
Obama Line
Keihan
Keihan Line
Uji Line
Keishin Line
Outou Line
Hankyu
Kyoto Line
Arashiyama Line
Kintetsu
Kyoto Line
Kyoto Municipal Subway
Karasuma Line
Tōzai Line
Sagano Scenic Railway (Arashiyama-Kameoka)
Kyoto Tango Railway
Miyafuku Line
Miyamai Line
Miyatoyo Line

City Tram 
Randen
Arashiyama Line
Kitano Line
Eiden
Eizan Line
Kurama Line

SeaPorts
Maizuru Port - Mainly international container terminal and ferry route to Hokkaido (Otaru and Tomakomai).

Roads

Expressways

Meishin Expressway
Shin-Meishin Expressway
Second Keihan Highway (Daini-Keihan Road)
Keiji(Kyoto-Shiga) Bypass
Maizuru Wakasa Expressway
Keinawa(Kyoto-Nara-Wakayama) Expressway
Kyoto-Jukan Expressway
San'in Kinki Expressway

National highways

Route 1 (Route 8)
Route 9 (Kyoto-Fukuchiyama-Tottori-Yonago-Izumo-Hamada-Yamaguchi)
Route 24 (Kyoto-Nara-Kashihara-Hashimoto-Wakayama)
Route 27 (Tanba-Maizuru-Tsuruga)
Route 162
Route 163
Route 171 (Kyoto-Takatsuki-Minoo-Itami-Nishinomiya)
Route 173
Route 175 (Akashi-Nishiwaki-Fukuchiyama-Maizuru)
Route 176 (Osaka-Sanda-Sasayama-Fukuchiyama-Miyazu)
Route 178
Route 307
Route 312
Route 372 (Kameoka-Sasayama-Kasai-Himeji)
Route 423
Route 426
Route 429
Route 477
Route 478

Culture 
Kyoto has been, and still remains, Japan's cultural center. For over 1000 years it was Japan's capital. When the capital was changed to Tokyo, Kyoto remained Japan's cultural capital. The local government proposes a plan to move the Agency for Cultural Affairs to Kyoto and to regard Tokyo as the capital of politics and economy and Kyoto as the capital of culture. See Culture of Japan.

Sports  

The sports teams listed below are based in Kyoto.

Football (soccer)
Kyoto Sanga F.C. (J1 League)
Ococias Kyoto AC (Kansai Soccer League)
AS. Laranja Kyoto (Kansai Soccer League)
Basketball
Kyoto Hannaryz (B.League)
Rugby
Mitsubishi Motors Kyoto Red Evolutions (Top West)
Shimadzu Breakers (Top West)
Unitika Phoenix (Top West)

Tourism 
Kyoto City is one of the most popular tourist spots in Japan, and many people from far and wide visit there.  Along with Tokyo, Kyoto is a favorite location for the graduation trip of Junior High and High schools.

Some of the festivals held in Kyoto are Aoi Matsuri from 544, Gion Matsuri from 869, Ine Matsuri from the Edo-era, Daimonji Gozan Okuribi from 1662, and Jidai Matsuri from 1895.  Every shrine and temple holds some sort of event, and many of them are open for public viewing.

International relations

Sister Autonomous Administrative division
Kyoto Prefecture has sister relationships with these places:

 Shaanxi Province, China
 Yogyakarta Special Region, Indonesia
 Oklahoma, United States
 Leningrad Oblast, Russia
 Edinburgh, Scotland
 Occitanie, France
 Quebec, Canada

These relationships are distinct from those of cities in Kyoto Prefecture with other cities.

References

External links 

Official Kyoto Prefecture website
Kyoto Prefectural International Center
Kyoto Prefecture Tourism Guide
Kyoto Visitors Guide

 
Kansai region
Prefectures of Japan
States and territories established in 1868
1868 establishments in Japan